Boobs is a Canadian animated short film, directed by Marie Valade and released in 2021. The film portrays a woman's complicated love-hate relationship with her own body, particularly but not exclusively her breasts.

The film premiered in June 2021 at the Annecy International Animation Film Festival, and had its Canadian premiere at the 2021 Toronto International Film Festival.

The film was named to TIFF's annual year-end Canada's Top Ten list for 2021. It received a Canadian Screen Award nomination for Best Animated Short at the 10th Canadian Screen Awards, and a Prix Iris nomination for Best Animated Short Film at the 24th Quebec Cinema Awards.

References

External links

2021 films
2021 short films
2021 animated films
Canadian animated short films
Quebec films
2020s Canadian films